Boekelheide is a surname. Notable people with the surname include:

Jay Boekelheide, American sound editor
Todd Boekelheide (born 1954), American film composer
Virgil Boekelheide, American chemist

See also
Boekelheide reaction, a chemical reaction named after Virgil Boekelheide